Louis-François Ollivier (Brest, 9 March 1770 — Daoulas-près-Brest, 11 September 1820) was a French Navy officer.

Career 
In 1809, Ollivier served as a lieutenant in the Escaut squadron. Along with Lieutenant Graton, he was tasked with a reconnaissance of the canals in Bruxelles and Bruges.

In 1812, promoted to commander, Ollivier was in command of the frigate Rubis. He chased and destroyed the British brig HMS Daring off Tamara in February 1813. Rubis was wrecked soon after, and her consort Aréthuse repatriated her crew after the action of 7 February 1813.

In 1816, Ollivier commanded the frigate Revanche, on which ferried a Navy official, Marine Bourilhon, to Saint-Pierre et Miquelon, before returning to Brest. The next year, he transported troops, despatches and convicts between France and Martinique.

References

Bibliography 
 Fonds Marine. Campagnes (opérations ; divisions et stations navales ; missions diverses). Inventaire de la sous-série Marine BB4. Tome deuxième: BB4 1 à 482 (1790-1826) 

French naval commanders of the Napoleonic Wars
French Navy officers from Brest, France
1770 births
1820 deaths